or  is a river in Troms og Finnmark county, Norway. The river flows from the lake Altevatnet northwest to the town of Setermoen, then north to the municipal border with Målselv (with the river forming part of the border) before finally emptying into the river Målselva, just outside the village of Bardufoss and the Bardufoss Airport.

Barduelva is the largest source of hydroelectricity in all of Troms county. There are three power plants on the river: Innset, Straumsmo, and Bardufoss. Combined, they generate  of power annually.

References

Rivers of Troms og Finnmark
Bardu
Målselv
Rivers of Norway